The women's lightweight single sculls rowing event at the 2015 Pan American Games was held from July 12–15 at the Royal Canadian Henley Rowing Course in St. Catharines.

Schedule
All times are Eastern Standard Time (UTC-3).

Results

Heats

Heat 1

Heat 2

Repechage

Finals

Final B

Final A

References

Women's rowing at the 2015 Pan American Games